Tir Kola (also Romanized as Tīr Kolā and Tīr Kalā; also known as Tīr Kūlā and Tīr Qal‘eh) is a village in Esfivard-e Shurab Rural District, in the Central District of Sari County, Mazandaran Province, Iran. At the 2006 census, its population was 1,239, in 341 families.

References 

Populated places in Sari County